Murphy of Anzac is a 1916 Australian silent film directed by J. E. Mathews. It tells the story of John Simpson Kirkpatrick during the Gallipoli campaign in World War I. It is considered a lost film.

Plot
John Simpson Kirkpatrick, aka "Murphy", an English emigrant to Queensland, enlists in the army in World War I and is attached to the ambulance corps. On the voyage over he discovers a traitor (Martyn Keith) giving information to the enemy by wireless and overcomes him. The Australian troops land at Gallipoli and Murphy brings the wounded back from the trenches on his donkey. He is killed by a Turkish shell while rescuing his 104th man.

A highlight of the film was the German spy being thrown off a cliff 50 foot into the water.

Production
The film was announced in March 1916.

The cast was largely returned servicemen. The technical adviser was Gallipoli veteran, Corporal Robson, who had known Simpson, and also appeared in the film.

Reception
The film ran for six weeks in Sydney and nine weeks in Melbourne.

Historical Accuracy
The film was criticised at the time by Gallipoli veterans for a number of historical errors including showing:
Murphy being allotted to the AMC when he was with the Ninth Division;
Murphy's mother in Australia, when she never left England;
Murphy killed by a shell when he was shot through the heart by a sniper near Shrapnel Gully;
Murphy receiving a white feather, when no such thing happened.

References

External links
 
Murphy of Anzac at National Film and Sound Archive

Australian black-and-white films
1916 films
1916 drama films
Australian drama films
Australian silent feature films
Lost Australian films
1916 lost films
Lost drama films
Silent drama films